Hamza Mendyl (born 21 October 1997) is a Moroccan professional footballer who plays as a left back for Belgian Pro League club OH Leuven and the Morocco national team.

Club career

Lille
Mendyl made his professional debut in a 1–0 Ligue 1 win for Lille over Caen on 16 February 2017.

Schalke 04
On 17 August 2018, Mendyl joined Schalke 04 on a five-year deal.

International career
Mendyl was born in Casablanca, Morocco to an Ivorian father and a Moroccan mother. He played for various youth Moroccan sides, before debuting for the senior Morocco national football team in a 2–0 2017 Africa Cup of Nations qualification win over São Tomé and Príncipe.

In May 2018 he was named in Morocco's 23-man squad for the 2018 FIFA World Cup in Russia.

Personal life 
Mendyl married Moroccan Instagram star Maroua Ourahali in late 2018. They had their honeymoon in the Maldives and now have a son together called Cayden, who was born on 20 February 2020. Hamza is a close friend of fellow footballer Amine Harit.

Career statistics

Club

International

References

External links

Lille Profile 2016-16 

1997 births
Living people
Moroccan footballers
Footballers from Casablanca
Morocco international footballers
Morocco youth international footballers
Moroccan expatriate footballers
Moroccan people of Ivorian descent
Association football fullbacks
Mohammed VI Football Academy players
Lille OSC players
FC Schalke 04 players
Dijon FCO players
Gaziantep F.K. footballers
Oud-Heverlee Leuven players
Ligue 1 players
Bundesliga players
Süper Lig players
Belgian Pro League players
2017 Africa Cup of Nations players
Expatriate footballers in France
Expatriate footballers in Germany
Moroccan expatriate sportspeople in France
2018 FIFA World Cup players